Choa Khalsa is a town and Union Council of Kallar Syedan Tehsil, Rawalpindi District, Punjab, Pakistan. Town consist of 800 houses. On 1 July 2004, Choa Khalsa became the Union Council.

History
The word Choa means a water spring and Khalsa is related to the Sikh movement. Khalsa is a strict Sikh religious order founded in 1699 by Guru Gobind Singh. the term Khalsa is an Arabic word. There are various interpretations to the term Khalsa, one of the general meaning of the term is free from impurities or pure. This term is also defined as the land or estate which belongs directly to the king, without any intermediary claims of lords/ noble or farmer to the same in the Rawalpindi District. Some villages go by the name of Dera Khalsa, Thoa Khalsa, Choa Khalsa, etc. They were so named because they were state owned villages during Sikh rule in Punjab. Choa Khalsa village is located about 60 km from Rawalpindi.

Notable people
Abdul Aziz Mirza, Chief of Naval Staff, ambassador to Saudi Arabia.

Villages
Choa Khalsa
Chullo Mirgala 
Dhoke Ch Feroze Khan
Dhoke kanyal
Dhok Dulal Qureshi
Khanada
Muhalla Akbari
Takal
Mohra Heran
Dhok Baba Balandiyan
Dhok Sadiq abad
Dhoke Gohar wali Takal
Pehr Hali
Rajam
Dhok Bangyal
Dhok Sangal
Khanadah
Mohalla Akbri
Sahot Hayal
Barri Bunn
Mohra Nagrial
Dhok Muqaddam
Ghadur
Mirghala Khalsa
Mohra Nagrial
Mohalla Rajgaan

Choa Khalsa Circle Union Councils 

Choa Khalsa is Center of 6 union councils

After Delimitation 2018 Choa Khalsa Circle 6 Union Councils of Kallar Syedan Tehsil Page 13 NA-58. Comes Under NA-58 (Rawalpindi-II), National Assembly.and in PP-7 (Rawalpindi-II) of Punjab Assembly.

External links
https://web.archive.org/web/20151208165732/http://www.pothwar.com/tehkallar

Union councils of Kallar Syedan Tehsil
Populated places in Kallar Syedan Tehsil
Towns in Kallar Syedan Tehsil